Dr. K. Ramiah (1892-1988) was an Indian parliamentarian. He wrote many books on rice and allied matters. He was awarded the Padma Shri in 1957 and the Padma Bhushan in 1970 for his contributions in the field of science and engineering. He was a nominated member of the Rajya Sabha from 1968 to 1974.

References

 Brief Biodata

Nominated members of the Rajya Sabha
Recipients of the Padma Shri in science & engineering
Recipients of the Padma Bhushan in science & engineering
1892 births
1974 deaths
Indian botanical writers